Little Girl is a 2020 French documentary film written and directed by Sébastien Lifshitz. The cinematography and editing was by Paul Guilhaume.  It focuses on the story of transgender seven-year-old Sasha, who was assigned male at birth but has known she is a girl since the age of four. She sees a psychiatrist with a special interest in gender who diagnosis her with gender dysphoria. The documentary follows the difficulty Sasha and her family face in helping her transition in provincial France.

Little Girl was screened at the Berlin International Film Festival in the Panorama Queer film section in 2020. It was shown at the Zurich Film Festival in 2020 and Chicago International Film Festival. In the UK, it was shown on BBC Four and BBC iPlayer under the Storyville documentary strand in 2021.

Reception 
Leslie Felperin of The Guardian gave the documentary 4 out of 5 stars, praising Guilhaume's "limpid" cinematography as "[allowing the viewer] to study every flicker of expression on the faces of Sasha and the adults around her".

Ben Dowell of The Times also gave the film 4 out of 5 stars.

Awards 

 The film won the European Film Award for Best Sound Designer at the European Film Awards. 
 The 2020 Grand Prix for Best Film at Film Fest Ghent. Silver Hugo for Best Documentary film at the 2020 Chicago International Film Festival 
 The Prix du public at the Rencontres Internationales du Documentaire de Montréal (RIDM) in 2020.
 Side by Side LGBT Film Festival, Saint Petersburg 2020 Best Documentary.

References

External links
 
 

2020 films
French documentary films
French LGBT-related films
2020 LGBT-related films
Films directed by Sébastien Lifshitz
Films about trans women
2020 documentary films
Transgender-related documentary films
2020s French films